The Delegation of the European Union to the United Nations represents the European Union in the United Nations, working in coordination with the diplomatic and consular missions of all the EU Member States.

Offices 
The European Union is represented by delegations accredited to UN bodies in:

Geneva
Paris
Nairobi
New York City
Rome
Vienna

Ambassadors 

Ambassador Olof Skoog is the Head of the Delegation of the European Union to the United Nations since December 2019. His predecessor was João Vale de Almeida of Portugal currently posted in London as Head of the EU Delegation to the United Kingdom.

See also 
European Union and the United Nations

References

External links
 Official Site

UN
EU
UN
EU